The 2013–14 Algerian Ligue Professionnelle 2 was the forty-eight edition of the Algerian second division since its establishment, and its fourth season of the league under its current title. A total of 16 teams contested the league. The league started August 23, 2013, and concluded on May 16, 2014. USM Bel-Abbès were crowned champions and promoted to the 2014–15 Algerian Ligue Professionnelle 1 along with NA Hussein Dey and ASM Oran. At the bottom of the table, A Bou Saâda, US Chaouia and USMM Hadjout were relegated.

Changes from last season

From Ligue Professionnelle 2
Promoted to Ligue 1
 CRB Aïn Fakroun
 RC Arbaâ
 MO Béjaïa

Relegated to Championnat National
 MO Constantine
 SA Mohammadia
 CR Témouchent

To Ligue Professionnelle 2
Relegated from Ligue 1
 CA Batna
 WA Tlemcen
 USM Bel-Abbès

Promoted from Championnat National
 A Bou Saâda
 US Chaouia
 USMM Hadjout

Team overview

Stadia and locations

Competition

League table

Season statistics

Top scorers

See also
 2013–14 Algerian Ligue Professionnelle 1
 2013–14 Algerian Cup

References

Algerian Ligue 2 seasons
2
Algeria